Between 1906 and 1930, the Daily Mail newspaper, initially on the initiative of its proprietor, Alfred Harmsworth, 1st Viscount Northcliffe, awarded numerous prizes for achievements in aviation. The newspaper would stipulate the amount of a prize for the first aviators to perform a particular task in aviation or to the winner of an aviation race or event. The most famous prizes were the £1,000 for the first cross-channel flight awarded to Louis Blériot in 1909 and the £10,000 given in 1919 to Alcock and Brown for the first non-stop transatlantic flight between North America and Ireland.

The prizes are credited with advancing the course of aviation during the early years, with the considerable sums offered becoming a much-coveted goal for the field's pioneers.

Prizes

In addition, four "consolation" prizes were awarded:

See also

 List of aviation awards
 Daily Mail
 Scott Collection, a collection of aerophilately items relating to the 1912 flights.

Annotations

Notes

References
Lewis, Peter. British Racing and Record-Breaking Aircraft. London:Putnam, 1970. .

Daily Mail
Aviation awards
Aviation history of the United Kingdom
Challenge awards